This article lists the prime ministers of Poland. The Prime Minister of Poland is the leader of the cabinet and the head of government of Poland.

Great Chancellors of Poland (1107–1795)

Prime ministers of the Duchy of Warsaw (1807–1813)

Presidents of the Polish National Government (1830–1831)

Presidents of the National Government of the Republic of Poland (1846)

President of the National Committee in Poznań (1848)

Presidents of the Polish National Government (1863–1864)

Prime ministers of the Kingdom of Poland (1917–1918)

Colour key (for political parties):

Prime ministers of the People's Republic (1918)
Colour key (for political parties):

Note: Until 11 November, Daszyński was Prime Minister in the Polish People's Republic, based at Lublin, in the territory occupied by Austrian troops. On 11 November, he was invited to form a national government but failed and resigned three days later.

Prime ministers of the Republic of Poland (1918–1939)

Colour key (for political parties):

Prime ministers of the Government of the Republic of Poland in Exile (1939–1990)

After the German conquest of Poland, a Polish government-in-exile was formed under the protection of France and Britain. The government was recognized by the United Kingdom and the United States until 5 July 1945, when the Western Allies accepted Stalin's Communist government. By the end of 1946, the government-in-exile had lost recognition by all but a handful of independent nations. Despite this, it continued in London until the election of Lech Wałęsa as President of the Republic of Poland in December 1990.

Prime ministers of the Government-in-Exile (with little or no international recognition, 1945–1990)

Chairmen of the Executive for National Unity (1954–1972)
In 1954, one group within the government-in-exile opposed the continuation of August Zaleski as President of the government-in-exile beyond the end of his seven-year term. They established the Council of National Unity, vested the powers of the President in the Rada Trzech (three-man council), and appointed their own government, the Executive for National Unity. After the death of Zaleski in 1972, the Council of National Unity dissolved and ceded its powers to Zaleski's successor Stanisław Ostrowski.
 Roman Odzierzyński (1954–1955)	
 Adam Ciołkosz (1956–1959)
 Witold Czerwiński (1959–1963)	
 Adam Ciołkosz (1963 – December 1966)
 Jan Starzewski (December 1966 – 1967)
 Kazimierz Sabbat (1967 – 8 July 1972)

Prime ministers of the Polish People's Republic (1944–1989)

Colour key (for political parties):

Prime ministers of the Republic of Poland (1989–present)

Political parties
Christian Democrat/Liberals

Conservatives

Social Democrats

 Invited to form a government by the President, but failed to form a government and resigned.

See also
President of Poland
List of heads of state of Poland
List of Polish monarchs

References

External links
The Chancellery of the Prime Minister

Poland
Lists of political office-holders in Poland

sv:Polens regeringschef#Lista över Polens premiärministrar